North Stoke may refer to:
North Stoke, a Domesday village in Lincolnshire, cleared in 1841 to create the park at Stoke Rochford.
North Stoke, Oxfordshire, England
North Stoke, Somerset, England
North Stoke, West Sussex, England
North Stoke (horse), a Thoroughbred racehorse

See also

South Stoke (disambiguation)
East Stoke (disambiguation)
Stoke (disambiguation)